Peter Murray Lillington (born 1959 in Ely, Cambridgeshire) is a former Scotland 'B' international rugby union player.

Rugby Union career

Amateur career

Lillington competed for Durham University RFC as an undergraduate. He continued his studies at Magdalene College, Cambridge, where he played for Cambridge University R. U. F. C. For his club rugby, Lillington turned out for Harlequins.

Provincial career

He played for the Anglo-Scots district side in the Scottish Inter-District Championship.

International career

He had two caps for Scotland 'B'. Both caps were against France 'B' from 1981 to 1982.

He represented Scotland as a forward on the 1981 Scotland rugby union tour of New Zealand.

Lillington initially pulled out of the tour due to university examinations clashing with the tour schedule, but was recalled to the Scotland squad in June after exams were over. He was not capped in a test match.

Family

He is the son of former sprinter Alan Lillington.

References

External links
 

1959 births
Living people
Alumni of Hatfield College, Durham
Alumni of Magdalene College, Cambridge
Cambridge University R.U.F.C. players
Durham University RFC players
Harlequin F.C. players
Rugby union players from Ely, Cambridgeshire
Scotland 'B' international rugby union players
Scottish Exiles (rugby union) players
Scottish rugby union players
Rugby union flankers